The Sermon on the Fall of Rome is a novel by the French writer Jérôme Ferrari, published in 2012. The book received the Prix Goncourt in 2012. It was translated to English from the original French by Geoffrey Strachan.

Summary 
The story begins with the manager of a village absconding, leaving behind a number of quarrelling would-be successors. As the story progresses, all of them fall prey to accusations of adultery and insolvency. The situation seems hopeless until Matthieu and Libero, natives of the village, rise to meet the challenge of succeeding the missing manager. 

Tragically, Matthieu and Libero are led astray by alcohol and women. The story encompasses themes of tragedy, human decadence, absurdity, romance, comedy, and wisdom.

See also
 2012 in literature
 Contemporary French literature

References

2012 French novels
French-language novels
Prix Goncourt winning works
Actes Sud books